Ouled Yaïch is a district in Blida Province, Algeria. It was named after its capital, Ouled Yaïch.

Municipalities
The district is further divided into 3 municipalities, one of them, Chréa, is the second least populous one in the country, and home to Chréa National Park:
Ouled Yaïch
Béni Mered 
Chréa

Districts of Blida Province